Late embryogenesis abundant proteins (LEA proteins) are proteins in plants,  and some bacteria and invertebrates that protect against protein aggregation due to desiccation or osmotic stresses associated with low temperature. LEA proteins were initially discovered accumulating late in embryogenesis of cotton seeds. Although abundant in seeds and pollens, LEA proteins have been found to protect against desiccation, cold, or high salinity in a variety of organisms, including the bacterium Deinococcus radiodurans, nematode Caenorhabditis elegans, Artemia (brine shrimp), and rotifers.

LEA proteins function by mechanisms which are distinct from those displayed by heat shock molecular chaperones. Although the causes of LEA protein induction have not yet been determined, conformational changes in transcription factors or integral membrane proteins due to water loss have been suggested. LEA proteins are particularly protective of mitochondrial membranes against dehydration damage.

See also 
 Cryptobiosis
 Antifreeze proteins

References

Proteins